USS or USNS Maury may refer to the following ships, named for Commodore Matthew Fontaine Maury:

USS Commodore Maury (SP-656), was a fishing steamer that served in a non-commissioned status in the 5th Naval District during World War I
 was a Wickes-class destroyer during World War I
 was a Gridley-class destroyer during World War II
 ex-Renate was an Artemis-class attack cargo ship during World War II and a survey ship from 1946 until stricken in 1969
, an oceanographic survey ship was built in 1989 and struck in 1994 then turned over to the Maritime Administration and renamed Golden Bear
, is a Pathfinder-class survey ship launched 2013

United States Navy ship names
USS